René & Angela is the debut album by American singing duo René & Angela. It was released on June 22, 1980 by Capitol Records.

Critical reception 

In review made before album release, Billboard editors found that the voices of performers complement one another into the perfect balance. Together with backing instruments it help to make a very stylistic debut.

Track listing
All tracks composed by René Moore and Angela Winbush; except where indicated
"Do You Really Love Me" – 3:21 	
"Turn It Out" – 4:20 	
"Everything We Do" – 5:27 	
"Hotel California" – (Don Felder, Glenn Frey, Don Henley) – 4:49 	
"I Don't Know (Where Love Comes From)" – 4:15 	
"Free and Easy" – 5:50 	
"Love Won't Slip Away" – 4:36 	
"Strangers Again" – 2:58

References

External links
 René & Angela-René & Angela at Discogs

1980 debut albums
René & Angela albums
Capitol Records albums